16 Wishes is a 2010 teen fantasy-comedy television film directed by Peter DeLuise and written by Annie DeYoung, starring Debby Ryan and Jean-Luc Bilodeau. It premiered on June 25, 2010, on Disney Channel in the United States and on July 16, 2010, on Family Channel in Canada. The film was the most watched cable program on the day of its premiere on the Disney Channel. In addition, 16 Wishes introduced Ryan to new audiences, such as the contemporary adult audiences since the movie received high viewership in the adults demographic (18–34). The film was the second most watched program on cable during the week of its premiere.

It was the second film to be released on Disney Channel in 2010 that was not promoted as a "Disney Channel Original Movie" (after Harriet the Spy: Blog Wars) and is a co-production between Disney Channel, Family Channel, Unity Pictures of Vancouver and MarVista Entertainment in Los Angeles. In other countries, it was advertised as a Disney Channel Original Movie. It was planned to have its UK premiere on November 19, 2010, on Disney Channel UK, but was replaced with Starstruck, which had already been shown in May; it was later shown in December 2010 in the UK.

Plot
Abby Jensen has been planning her sweet sixteen since she was a little girl. She keeps a list of wishes that she wants to come true. When the big day finally arrives, she excitedly adds her sixteenth and final wish to the list: a photo of Logan, her crush. Her parents and her brother Mike surprise her, but she rudely rejects them. Then begins the first of many unusual occurrences, each involving visits from a peculiar woman, Celeste. She first appears as an exterminator when the Jensens' house gets overrun by wasps from a nest that had been building up for 16 years. Celeste saves Abby's wish list, but the family is unable to go back inside their house until the wasps are exterminated.

Abby's best friend, Jay Kepler, appears and offers Abby his jacket. When Abby reaches into a pocket, she finds a birthday present for her—a necklace with a half of a heart saying "BFF." Jay uses the other half as a charm on his key ring. A delivery truck pulls up, and Celeste comes out dressed as a mail woman and gives a package with 16 candles and a matchbox to Abby. Abby lights the first candle, her first wish, meeting celebrity Joey Lockhart, is fulfilled. Abby then realizes that the candles correspond to the wishes on her wish list. Abby lights up the eighth candle and her wish for a red car is fulfilled. Out of the car comes Celeste. Abby realizes Celeste is a magical being and her wishes come true each time a candle is lit, and Celeste appears whenever a wish is granted.

Abby unsuccessfully tries to make a third wish. Celeste explains that Abby must wait to make new wishes within new hours, and that, at midnight, Abby's candles expire and the wishes she made will be permanent. Abby makes more wishes, causing her to beat her nemesis, Krista Cook, who has the same birthday as her, in a volleyball match, and become student body president. Abby remembers that she needs a dress for her birthday party and decides buy it with Jay, who agrees to pay for it. They are followed by Krista, who takes Jay's wallet when he drops it. She convinces the store clerk that the two are not actually going to buy anything; the clerk kicks them out. Abby uses the 9th candle to make a wish to be treated like an adult, which adds consequences of adulthood that she did not think of. Abby is suddenly not allowed to attend high school anymore, and no one at school remembers her, not even Jay. Her parents buy her a new apartment and leave her to live on her own.

Regretting her wish, Abby unsuccessfully tries to make new wishes and change some. Abby makes a wish for her parents to understand her; her parents do understand her, but under the impression that she is an adult. Abby walks by Krista's Sweet 16 and spots Jay. She restores Jay's memories that they are best friends by showing him the necklace he gave her. However, Jay is unable to help her. Abby talks to Krista, and realizes that she is on good terms with her in adulthood. She also realizes that Jay wanted to be student body president all along. Desperate, Abby returns to her apartment where Celeste appears. Abby talks with Celeste as she tells her how selfish she was for thinking about herself over her friends and family because she didn't realize what she already had. Abby eventually found a loophole through the rules of magic because her last wish was glued on with gum, acting as a "barrier" between the picture and the rules. She switches the picture for a picture of her taken that morning and wishes she could go back to that morning right before midnight strikes.

Abby's life then goes back to normal. Abby throws her wish list away and gives her money to Mike for a guitar. Abby finds Krista carrying posters saying 'Vote For Krista.' She and Krista reconcile after Krista tells Abby that she dislikes her because she took Jay away from her as a friend. Abby and Krista stop competing and work together to make Jay student body president, fulfilling his dream. Abby and Krista have a joint birthday party. Krista and Logan become a couple, and Mike's talent is recognized. Abby tells Jay that she has no more wishes, and they kiss. Celeste then turns into a fairy and flies away. The couples—Abby and Jay and Krista and Logan—then dance together at the party.

Cast

Production
Some scenes were filmed at Walnut Grove Secondary School in Langley, British Columbia.

Soundtrack

16 Wishes is the soundtrack album for the film of the same name, released on June 15, 2010, by MarVista Entertainment.

Track listing

Reception
The movie garnered over 5.6 million viewers in its first showing. The film went on to become the most watched cable program on the day of its premiere on Disney Channel. The Sunday airing of the film received over 4.0 million viewers.

References

External links
 Official website 
 

2010 television films
2010 films
2010 comedy films
2010 fantasy films
2010s American films
2010s Canadian films
2010s English-language films
2010s fantasy comedy films
2010s teen comedy films
2010s teen fantasy films
American comedy television films
American fantasy comedy films
American teen comedy films
Canadian comedy television films
Canadian fantasy comedy films
Canadian teen comedy films
Fantasy television films
Films about birthdays
Films about wish fulfillment
Films shot in Vancouver
Films directed by Peter DeLuise